Stephen C. Harrison is professor of biological chemistry and molecular pharmacology, professor of pediatrics, and director of the Center for Molecular and Cellular Dynamics of Harvard Medical School, head of the Laboratory of Molecular Medicine at Boston Children's Hospital, and investigator of the Howard Hughes Medical Institute.

Education and career
He received his B.A. in chemistry and physics from Harvard in 1963, and was then a Henry fellow at the MRC Laboratory of Molecular Biology at Cambridge. In 1967, he received his Ph.D. in biophysics from Harvard, was a research fellow there as well as a junior fellow in the Society of Fellows, and joined the Harvard faculty in 1971.

Research
His wide-ranging studies of protein structure have contributed insights to viral architecture, DNA–protein recognition, and cellular signaling.

Harrison has made important contributions to structural biology, most notably by determining and analyzing the structures of viruses and viral proteins, by crystallographic analysis of protein–DNA complexes, and by structural studies of protein-kinase switching mechanisms. The initiator of high-resolution virus crystallography, he has moved from his early work on tomato bushy stunt virus (1978) to the study of more complex human pathogens, including the capsid of human papillomavirus, the envelope of dengue virus, and several components of HIV. He has also turned some of his research attention to even more complex assemblies, such as clathrin-coated vesicles.  He led the Structural Biology team at the Center for HIV/AIDS Vaccine Immunology (CHAVI) when it received National Institute of Allergy and Infectious Diseases (NIAID) funding  of around $300 million to address key immunological roadblocks to HIV vaccine development and to design, develop and test novel HIV vaccine candidates.

Society memberships
He is a member of American Academy of Arts and Sciences, National Academy of Sciences, American Philosophical Society, European Molecular Biology Organization,	American Crystallographic Association and American Association for the Advancement of Science.

Awards
 1982 Ledlie Prize, Harvard University
 1988 Wallace P. Rowe Award, National Institute of Allergy and Infectious Diseases
 1990 Louisa Gross Horwitz Prize (with Don Wiley and Michael Rossmann), Columbia University
 1990 Harvey Lecturer, The Harvey Society, New York
 1995 George Ledlie Prize, Harvard University
 1997 ICN International Prize in Virology
 2001 Paul Ehrlich and Ludwig Darmstaedter Prize (with Michael Rossmann)
 2005 Bristol-Myers Squibb Award for Distinguished Achievement in Infectious Diseases Research
 2006 Gregori Aminoff Prize in Crystallography (with David Stuart)
 2007 UCSD/Merck Life Sciences Achievement Award
 2011 William Silen Lifetime Achievement in Mentoring Award, Harvard Medical School
 2012 Pauling Lectureship, Stanford University
 2014 Elected as a Foreign Member of the Royal Society of London.
 2015 The Welch Award in Chemistry
 2015 Honorary Doctorate in Medicine, University of Milan
 2018 48th Rosenstiel Award for research on proteins and viruses.

Personal life 
Harrison has been married to Tomas Kirchhausen, who is currently a Professor at Harvard Medical School, since 2013. They first met in 1978 at a small dinner hosted by Ada Yonath. In the fall of 1979, Tom moved to Cambridge, MA, to work with Harrison, and the two have been in a relationship ever since.

References

Structural biology
American crystallographers
HIV/AIDS researchers
Harvard University alumni
Members of the United States National Academy of Sciences
Howard Hughes Medical Investigators
Living people
Foreign Members of the Royal Society
Year of birth missing (living people)
American LGBT scientists
Members of the American Philosophical Society